Abarr is an unincorporated community in Yuma County, in the U.S. state of Colorado.

History
Abarr was originally called "Brownsville", and under the latter name was platted in 1922. The present name "Abarr" was adopted in 1923. A post office called Abarr was established in 1923, and remained in operation until 1948. Abarr was named after the maiden name of Ethel Hoffman, the wife of Silas Hoffman, a couple who owned a postal office there.

References

Unincorporated communities in Yuma County, Colorado
Unincorporated communities in Colorado